The 1994 Tercera División play-offs to Segunda División B from Tercera División (Promotion play-offs) were the final playoffs for the promotion from 1993–94 Tercera División to 1994–95 Segunda División B. The first four teams of each group took part in the play-off.

Group A-1

Group A-2

Group A-3

Group A-4

Group B-1

Group B-2

Group B-3

Group B-4

Group C-1

Group C-2

Group C-3

Group C-4

Group D-1

Group D-2

Group D-3

Group D-4

Group E

See also
1993–94 Tercera División

External links
Futbolme.com

Tercera División play-offs
2